Roslindale Congregational Church is a historic Congregational church at 25 Cummins Highway, at the corner of Summer Avenue in the Roslindale neighborhood of Boston, Massachusetts.  The Shingle-Romanesque style church was designed by James Murray (believed to be a member of the congregation) and built 1893-96 for a congregation established in 1890 by Rev. William Grover.  It has a monumental scale typical of Richardsonian works, and a tower topped by a pyramidal roof and corner turrets.

The building was listed on the National Register of Historic Places in 1991.

See also
National Register of Historic Places listings in southern Boston, Massachusetts

References

Churches completed in 1893
19th-century churches in the United States
Churches on the National Register of Historic Places in Massachusetts
Romanesque Revival church buildings in Massachusetts
Congregational churches in Boston
Shingle Style church buildings
National Register of Historic Places in Boston
Congregational churches in Massachusetts
Shingle Style architecture in Massachusetts